The International Jean Sibelius Violin Competition, named after Finnish composer Jean Sibelius, is a competition for violinists up to age 30. It is held every five years in Helsinki. The first competition took place in year 1965, eight years after the death of the composer to mark the centenary of the composer's birth. The competition is arranged by the Sibelius Society of Finland and the Sibelius Academy.

The competition has always had high-level competitors, and winners such as Oleg Kagan, Viktoria Mullova, and Leonidas Kavakos have become internationally performing soloists. The popularity amongst the players might be explained by the location of the competition: Finland connecting western Europe and USSR was probably considered safe enough by the Soviet authority to allow players to attend the competition.

Structure
The competition has three rounds: the first round, the second round, and the final round. After each round, a number of competitors are chosen to proceed to the next round, and after the final round the finalists are ranked. In the final ranking, the performance in each round is considered as a whole. To be accepted in the competition, candidates need to send a performance sample for a competition committee for pre-selection.

The first round program consists typically works of Bach, a sonata by Mozart, and Paganini's capriccios. It is said that Bach measures readiness, Mozart measures understanding of style, and Paganini measures technical ability. The second round, often referred as the semi-finals, consists typically of a sonata for violin and piano, few pieces by Sibelius, a modern Finnish piece, and a virtuoso piece. In the final round, the finalists perform two concertos accompanied by a full symphony orchestra. One of the concertos is mandated as the Violin Concerto in D minor by Sibelius.

In 2005, 175 applications were received, 58 competitors were accepted of which 50 took part in the competition, 20 proceeded to the second round, and 8 were chosen to the final round.

Laureates

See also 
 List of classical music competitions
 World Federation of International Music Competitions

References

External links
 
 The competition pages of Finnish Broadcasting Company
 The Sibelius Society of Finland 

Violin competitions
Music competitions in Finland
Things named after Jean Sibelius